Izvoru is a commune in Argeș County, Muntenia, Romania. It is composed of a single village, Izvoru.

References

Communes in Argeș County
Localities in Muntenia